Vrhovnik is a surname. Notable people with the surname include: 

 Majda Vrhovnik (1922–1945), Slovene communist and medical student
 Matjaž Vrhovnik (born 1972), Slovene skier
 Vid Vrhovnik (born 1999), Slovene skier

Other uses
 A military rank conferred by the Croatian Parliament on Franjo Tuđman in 1995, meaning 'supreme commander'